Meelo Evaru Koteswarudu (English: Who is the millionaire among you all?) is a Telugu Film directed by E. Satti Babu and produced by K. K. Radhamohan starring Naveen Chandra, Shruti Sodhi, Murali Sharma, Prudhviraj and Saloni Aswani among others. The film was released on December 16, 2016.

Cast 
 Naveen Chandra as Prashanth
Shruti Sodhi as Priya
Prudhviraj as Variation Star Veera Babu
Saloni Aswani as Samantha
Jaya Prakash Reddy as An actor who acted as Father character of hero
Posani Krishna Murali as Tatha Rao
Murali Sharma as A.B.R, Priya's father
Raghu Babu as Film Producer 
Prabhas Sreenu as P.A of director
Chalapathi Rao
Dhanraj as Prashant 's friend 
Pilla Prasad
Saana
Vidyullekha Raman as Priya's friend

Production
The first schedule of the movie started in mid 2016, and few pictures and teaser of the movie floated on the internet.

Soundtrack 
Audio of the movie was released on 19 October 2016.

References

External links

 

2016 films
2010s Telugu-language films
Films shot in Telangana
Films directed by E. Satti Babu